Neferneferure ( "beautiful are the beauties of Re") (14th century BCE) was an ancient Egyptian princess of the 18th Dynasty. She was the fifth of six known daughters of Pharaoh Akhenaten and his Great Royal Wife Nefertiti.

Family
Neferneferure was born in or before the 8th regnal year of her father Akhenaten in the city of Akhetaten. She had four older sisters named Meritaten, Meketaten, Ankhesenpaaten and Neferneferuaten Tasherit, as well as a younger sister named Setepenre.

Life

One of the earliest depictions of Neferneferure is in a fresco from the King's House in Amarna. She is depicted sitting on  a pillow with her sister Neferneferuaten Tasherit. The fresco is dated to ca. year 9 of Akhenaten, and the entire family is depicted, including the baby Setepenre.

Neferneferure is depicted at the Durbar in year 12 in the tomb of the Overseer of the royal quarters Meryre II in Amarna. Akhenaten and Nefertiti are shown seated in a kiosk, receiving tribute from foreign lands. The daughters of the royal couple are shown standing behind their parents. Neferure is the middle daughter in the lower register. She is holding a gazelle in her right arm and a lotus flower in her left. She is standing right behind her sister Neferneferuaten Tasherit. Her sister Setepenre is standing behind her and is shown reaching over to pet the gazelle.

Death and burial
Neferneferure probably died in the 13th or 14th regnal year, possibly in the plague that swept across Egypt during this time. She is absent from one scene and her name was plastered  over in another scene in the Royal Tomb in Amarna. To be specific, on Wall C of the chamber  of the Royal Tomb her name was mentioned among the five princesses (the list excluded the youngest, Setepenre, who was possibly dead by this time), but was later covered by plaster. On Wall B of the chamber  she is missing from the scene which shows her parents and three elder sisters – Meritaten, Ankhesenpaaten and Neferneferuaten Tasherit – mourning the dead second princess, Meketaten. This suggests that she is likely to have died shortly before the decoration of these chambers was finished. It is possible that Neferneferure was actually buried in chamber  of the royal tomb.

Alternatively she may have been buried in Tomb 29 in Amarna. This theory is based on an amphora handle bearing an inscription mentioning the inner (burial) chamber of Neferneferure. If Neferneferure was buried in tomb 29, then this may mean the Royal Tomb was already sealed at the time of her burial and that she may have died after the death of her father Akhenaten.

Other objects mentioning Neferneferure

A lid of a small box (JdE 61498) bearing her picture was found among the treasures of Tutankhamun. It shows the princess crouching, with a finger pressed to her mouth, as very young children were often depicted. On the lid Re's name in her name was written phonetically instead of with the usual circled dot.

References

 Christiane Desroches-Noblecourt: Tutankhamen – Life and Death of a Pharaoh

Princesses of the Eighteenth Dynasty of Egypt
14th-century BC Egyptian women
Children of Akhenaten
Nefertiti
Royalty who died as children